The Wengen–Männlichen aerial cableway is a cable car linking Wengen with the Männlichen in Switzerland. It is owned and operated by the Luftseilbahn Wengen–Männlichen AG.

History
In 1949, a number of concerned individuals from the resort of Wengen got together and founded a committee to provide a link between the resort and ski and hiking region of the Männlichen. Building began in 1953 and the cableway was opened on 22 July 1954. The estimated CHF 1.59 million building costs were overrun by about 4%.

As built, the cableway had two cabins each of which carried 40 people. These were replaced in 1963 by cabins for 50 persons, at the same time as the valley station was extended. In 1973, the drive motor was replaced. In 1992 and 1993, the cableway, with the exception of the stations, was completely renovated at a cost of around CHF 8.7 million. Two new 80 person cabins were put into service, and journey time was reduced from 6–7 minutes to 4–5 minutes.

As a consequence the cableway was shut for several months, and the canton of Bern decided that operation could not resume from the old location. Instead it was decided to rebuild the station outside the avalanche zone and close to the main street of Wengen. Operation resumed by the end of year.

For 2017 the service generated CHF 3,000,000 of income and a profit of CHF 86,000, with 218,315 passengers in the winter season, and 122,708 in the summer.

In 2018 the cars were replaced. The new cars included a detachable balcony offering an outside ride, named the Royal Ride, available to passengers for a CHF 5 supplement.

Operations

Connections
It is a 4-minute walk from the top station at Männlichen to the Grindelwald–Männlichen gondola cableway. It is a 3-minute walk from the base station in Wengen to the Wengernalp railway's Wengen station.

See also
List of aerial tramways in Switzerland

References

External links
 
 Wengen–Männlichen aerial cableway official web site

Bernese Oberland
Cable cars in Switzerland
Transport in the canton of Bern
1954 establishments in Switzerland